La Classique Morbihan is a women's one-day cycle race which takes place in France and is currently rated by the UCI as category 1.1, having been rated 1.2 in 2015. It is held as the first race of the Grand Prix Morbihan weekend in Grand-Champ, with the Grand Prix du Morbihan for both men and women held the following day.

Previous winners

References

External links

Women's cycle races
Cycle races in France
Recurring sporting events established in 2015
2015 establishments in France
Sport in Morbihan